Antonije "Anta" Simeonović, better known  as Čolak-Anta (1777–1853) was a Serbian fighter and military commander (Vojvoda), one of the most important figures of the First Serbian Uprising of 1804-1813, a spontaneous armed rebellion that became a war of liberation from the Ottoman Empire, the Serbian Revolution ultimately became a symbol of the nation-building process in the Balkans, provoking unrest among the Christians in both Greece and Bulgaria. He was a military commander, governor of the province of Kruševac, and later in life, Chief Magistrate.  Čolak-Anta fought under Grand Leader Karađorđe, and is the eponymous founder of the notable Čolak-Antić family.

Early life
Simeonović was born in Sredska, Kosovo, at the time part of the Ottoman Empire. As was the case with many of prominent 19th-century Serbian families who migrated from other Serbian lands to Serbia, the Simeonović family hailed from Herzegovina.
As a young man he moved to Belgrade where he was a prosperous merchant trading furs but also smuggling weaponry across the Sava from the Habsburg Empire. His real name was Anta (from Antonije, en. Anthony), he was first nicknamed Uzun because of his height but later became known by the name Čolak-Anta (çolak meaning one-armed or one-handed person in Turkish) when, in 1806, during a fight with an Ottoman commander in Ostruznica on the bank of the river Sava, he was hit with a sabre and lost the usage of his left hand.

The Uprising

At the beginning of the 19th century Serbia has been ruled by the Ottoman Empire for almost three centuries; In late 1801 renegade Janissary leaders (soldiers of the Ottoman sultan see janissary) ruled over that northern edge of the Ottoman Empire known as the Sanjak of Smederevo or Pashalik of Belgrade, with unrestrained brutality, the four were known as the Dahijas.
Their cruelty had made them many enemies among the Christian Serb so the Dahije decided to strike against the leadership of the revolt before it started.
They began to disarm the population then set about exterminating all the Serbs they had most to fear: veterans of the war of 1788-91 with Austria, nobles or knez and village priests; The severed heads were put on public display in central squares and at city gates to serve as an example to those who might plot against their rule. The event is known as the Slaughter of the Knezes. 
The massacre precipitated what the Janissaries most hoped to avoid: a general uprising of the Christian Serbs. 
The Serbs replied by murdering the soubashis and leading women and children away to safe retreats in the mountains and the woods; thus started the beginning of modern history on the Balkan Peninsula.

On the eve of the uprising Čolak-Anta Simeonović acquired ammunitions and weapons that he smuggled from Prizren to Belgrade, after learning of his mission a group is sent to intercept him and take possession of the guns, Čolak-Anta and his men refused to hand over the weapons or surrender, they managed to make their way to rebel held Topola where he hands over weapons and ammunitions to Karađorđe, the rebel leader; Čolak-Anta joins Karađorđe's army.

Revolt against the Dahijas
That same day, a Turkish caravanserai in Orašac is burned to the ground by the rebels. Similar actions are undertaken in surrounding villages and then spread further. The Serbs entered, on what was in view of their small numbers, an amazing series of military success; Čolak-Anta repeatedly distinguishes himself in the battles which ensued as a resourceful, brave fighter, becoming one of Karadjorje's leaders.  
First they captured Rudnik (28 February 1804), which was under control of Sali Aga, and then Valjevo and Požarevac (18 May 1804), some 50 miles east of Belgrade, and Šabac (1 May 1804) about the same distance to the West, on the river Sava.
In September 1804, determined to seek foreign help, the Serbian Rebels sent a deputation to St Petersburg, which returned with the promise of diplomatic support but nothing more.
In 1806 they invested Smederevo making it the temporary capital of Serbia, then the rebels captured Belgrade (December 29, 1806) .
The Dahias fled from Belgrade, abandoning their followers, but they were captured on Ada Kaleh island on the Danube and executed.
By the winter of 1806 the Serbs had gained control of the whole Sanjak, including Belgrade. 
The success of the uprising as well as Napoleon’s invasion of Egypt in 1798 led the Ottomans to fear a Christian insurrection, the Ottoman Sultan Selim III started to negotiate with the rebels, he offered them autonomy but the Serbs refused demanding nothing but complete independence from Turkish rule. With the failure of the negotiation the Sultan launched a massive military campaign against the uprising. 
Čolak-Anta and his fellow rebels found themselves opposing the Ottoman Sultan's army sent to quell the rebellion.

War with the Ottoman Empire
The rebels achieved several victories and were able to withstand Ottoman forces despite the fact that the Ottoman Sultan had declared Holy War against them. In December 1806 the Serbian rebels defeat a larger Ottoman army at Deligrad, resulting in a truce.
A major diplomatic initiative to solicit support again from Austria and Russia produced a more favourable reaction that had been the case in the preceding two years as on January 5, 1807 the Turks had declared war against Russia and Great Britain. 
Together with Voivoda Vujica Vulićević, Čolak-Anta led Karađorđe's offensive towards the Ottoman fortress towns of Nikšić and Klobuk in Herzegovina, leading one battalion across the river Tara and through Drobnjak, Čolak-Anta came below Nikšić to occupy a positions in Prevoje where he awaits support from Montenegrin troops. 
In May 1809, Čolak-Anta crossed the Lim river with 2,000 men and attacked the Ottoman garrison of Prijepolje. 
By mid-July 1810 The Russo-Turkish War (1806–1812) brought the Russians on the banks of the Danube to help the Serbs for the first and last time. Under the command of Russian nobleman of Irish ancestry Count Joseph O'Rourke 3,500 Russian 
regulars  joined with elements of the Serbian army to conduct joint military operations against Ottoman forces. The Ottoman garrison of Brza Palanka surrenders to the combined Serbian-Russian army marching on the city. 
The rebels forces managed to advanced towards Niš and even gained territory in Bosnia.
Karađorđe appealed to the confraternity of the Montenegrins and Bosnians to restore the unity of the Serbian nation, he sent a diplomatic delegation consisting of Čolak-Anta Simeonović and Raka Levajac as advance party.
For the first time an entire Christian population had successfully risen up against the Ottomans and Serbia existed as a de facto independent state.

Exile and Amnesty
The withdrawal of Russian troops following the Russian-Ottoman Treaty of Bucharest (1812) allowed the Ottomans to concentrate on the Serbian rebels, Article VIII of the treaty stipulated that the Sultan should pardon the Serbs for having risen against him and promise them immunity from retribution from what had occurred; that the Serbs should govern themselves and pay an agreed tribute  but the Ottoman's Sultan was resolved to humiliate the Serbs who had in recent years so often humiliated the might of the Ottoman Empire, as soon as the Russian armies had evacuated.
three formidable Turkish armies converged on Serbia, on three fronts, to crush the insurrection without outside interference; eventually, the rebel forces, exhausted, were compelled to retreat across the Danube to Austria and then to Bessarabia to seek support from Austria or from Russia once more
In September 1814 Čolak-Anta and his family moved to Russia with his wife Jelena and children: Jovanka, Angelka, Stevan and Kosta.
His son Konstantin was accepted in the First Cadet Corps at Saint Petersburg by special decree of Emperor Alexander I.
Čolak-Anta and his family returned to Serbia in 1831 after the country became a semiautonomous state and a full amnesty was granted to those who had participated in the rebellion.

Service for Serbia

Rank and title
In 1809 Karađorđe gave Čolak-Anta  the rank of buljubaša, putting him in command of a company of men or Cheta 
In 1811, after a governing council representing each of the twelves districts was established, Čolak-Anta was appointed the position of Vojvode ("governor, duke"), of the province (nahija) of Kruševac, the former Serbian capital, with 31 townships under his administration.

In 1831 after returning from exile to semiautonomous Serbia, Čolak-Anta was appointed Chief Magistrate, a function he held until his retirement in 1843.

Descendants
He died on 23 August 1853 in Kragujevac, leaving to his descendants the surname of Čolak-Antić (Tcholak-Antitch or Colak-Antic).
With his wife Jelena he had a son Konstantin and five daughters, with his second wife Stoja he had a son: Paul
Kostantin married Jovanka Mitrović descendant of medieval Serbian nobility Rašković Princes; their male descendants all attended the Military Academy and include:
 Lt. Colonel Lazar Tcholak-Antitch, commander of the Morava division (1839–1877), daughter Milica married Vladislav F Ribnikar founder of Politika.
 Cavalry Colonel Milivoje Tcholak-Antitch (1884–1944) Recipient of the Order of Karađorđe's Star
 Milica Krstić Čolak-Antić (1887-1964) sister of Milivoje, considered one of the most important woman architect of the first half of the 20th century.
 Colonel Ilya Tcholak-Antitch, commander of the Ibar Army (1836–1894); he married Jelena Matić, daughter of Dimitrije Matić, Minister of Justice and Education, they had a daughter, Jovanka and two sons: Boško and Vojin.
 Dr. Boško Tcholak-Antitch, Marshal of the King's Petar Ist Court, Envoy Extraordinary, Ambassador and Minister Plenipotentiary of the Kingdom of Yugoslavia (1871–1949)
 Division General Vojin Tcholak-Antitch, Chief Inspector of Cavalry, Commander of the Order of the Légion d'Honneur (1877–1945); He married Mary Grujić, daughter of Sava Grujić, five times Prime Minister of The Kingdom of Serbia and grandson of Vojvoda Vule Ilic Kolarac, they had a daughter and three sons:
 Cavalry Colonel (French army) Ilija Tcholak-Antitch (1905–1974)
 Cavalry Major Grujica Tcholak-Antitch (1906–1967)
 Cavalry Lt Colonel Petar Tcholak-Antitch (1907–1964)

Legacy
Čolak Antina is a street of the western section of downtown Belgrade (Savski Venac) named after Čolak-Anta Simonović
The town of Kruševac, central Serbia, has a street named Čolak Antina

See also
The Slava (Serbian patron saint) of the family is St. Archangel Michael.
Čolak-Antić family page (in Serbian)

 List of Serbian Revolutionaries

References

18th-century Serbian people
19th-century Serbian people
People of the First Serbian Uprising
Serbian military leaders
Serbian revolutionaries
People from Prizren
Kosovo Serbs
Characters in Serbian epic poetry
1853 deaths
Year of birth missing
Serbian merchants
Čolak-Antić family